Naguru Assembly constituency was an ST reserved constituency of the Andhra Pradesh Legislative Assembly, India. It is one of 9 constituencies in the Vizianagaram district.

Overview
It was a part of the Araku Lok Sabha constituency along with another six Vidhan Sabha segments, namely, Palakonda, Parvathipuram, Salur, Araku Valley, Paderu and Rampachodavaram.

Members of Legislative Assembly

See also
 List of constituencies of Andhra Pradesh Legislative Assembly

References

Former assembly constituencies of Andhra Pradesh